This is a list of Japanese disasters by their death toll. Included in the list are disasters both natural and man-made, but it excludes acts of war and epidemics. The disasters occurred in Japan and its territories or involved a significant number of Japanese citizens in a specific event, where the loss of life was 30 or more.

See also
 List of deadly earthquakes since 1900
 List of earthquakes in Japan
 List of volcanic eruptions by death toll
 Natural disasters in Japan

References

Disasters by death toll
Japan
Japan
Disasters